Zhang Di (Chinese: 张迪) is a female Chinese Judoka. She competed at 1992 Barcelona Olympic Games, and won a bronze medal in Women's 61 kg.

References

Olympic bronze medalists for China
Living people
Olympic medalists in judo
Asian Games medalists in judo
Year of birth missing (living people)
Judoka at the 1990 Asian Games
Judoka at the 1994 Asian Games
Chinese female judoka
Medalists at the 1992 Summer Olympics
Asian Games gold medalists for China
Asian Games bronze medalists for China
Medalists at the 1990 Asian Games
Medalists at the 1994 Asian Games
Olympic judoka of China
Judoka at the 1992 Summer Olympics